Marianne Sandahl Bjorøy (born 30 March 1962) is a Norwegian politician for the Labour Party.

She served as a deputy representative to the Parliament of Norway from Hordaland during the term 2013–2017. She became mayor of Fjell following the 2015 Norwegian local elections.

References

1962 births
Living people
People from Fjell
Deputy members of the Storting
Labour Party (Norway) politicians
Mayors of places in Hordaland
Women mayors of places in Norway
20th-century Norwegian women politicians
20th-century Norwegian politicians
Women members of the Storting